Neue Welt (English: New World) was a concert hall in Berlin, Germany. Neue Welt had two halls. The smaller one held 1,500 people, the larger one up to 3,000. Both were rebuilt around 1950. Adolf Hitler spoke at Neue Welt in 1930 to an audience containing Albert Speer who would later be appointed First Architect. From the 1960s until its closing in 1982, it was a popular venue for pop and rock concerts. Notable performers included Dio, Jimi Hendrix, Ted Nugent, Whitesnake and Bob Seger. Today there is a venue called Huxley's Neue Welt at this location.

References

External links

 "Huxleys Neue Welt" (german)

Concert halls in Germany